Hesperilla sarnia, commonly known as the swift sedge skipper, is a species of butterfly in the family Hesperiidae. It is endemic to Queensland, Australia.

The larvae feed on Scleria species, including Scleria levis. They create a shelter with leaves of their host and silk. They hide in this shelter during the day and emerge to feed nocturnally. Pupation takes place inside this shelter.

External links
Australian Insects
Australian Faunal Directory

Trapezitinae
Butterflies described in 1978